The Education Act 1877 established twelve regional Education Boards in New Zealand after the provinces were abolished and the central government took control of education. The act established that education would be free, compulsory, and secular for Pākehā children aged five to thirteen.

History
Education had previously been the responsibility of provincial governments. Through the Abolition of Provinces Act 1875, the provinces ceased to exist on 1 January 1877. The Canterbury education system developed by William Rolleston was used as an exemplar for the Education Act 1877, and under Rolleston's guidance, Charles Bowen helped form the legislation. The act passed into law on 29 November 1877 and came into operation on 1 January 1878.

The Education Act 1877 was repealed through the Education Acts Compilation Act 1904, also known under its short title "The Education Act, 1904", and passed into law on 4 November 1904.

Effects
The act established that education would be free, compulsory, and secular for Pākehā children aged five to thirteen. Compulsory primary school education for Māori children did not become law until 1894.

Compulsory education did not happen in practice. Especially in rural areas, children often helped with tasks at home rather than attend school.

Education Boards
The act established a tiered administration system. At the top, the Department of Education established the curriculum and provided funding to twelve education boards (Auckland, Taranaki, Wanganui, Wellington, Hawke's Bay, Marlborough, Nelson, N & S Canterbury, Westland, Otago and Southland). Each of the boards in turn funded a school committee responsible for individual schools.

See also
History of education in New Zealand

References

External links
Education Records from Archives New Zealand

History of education in New Zealand
Education law
1877 in New Zealand law
Statutes of New Zealand
1877 in law
Repealed New Zealand legislation
1877 in education